Maytown is an unincorporated community and census-designated place (CDP) in Lancaster County, Pennsylvania. The population was 4,098 at the 2020 census.

History
Maytown is noted as the birthplace of 19th-century politician Simon Cameron, who served in the Cabinet of President Abraham Lincoln.

The Grove Mansion was listed on the National Register of Historic Places in 1983. William H. Strayer, born in Maytown in 1847, earned the Congressional Medal of Honor on May 22, 1872, along with William F. Cody and two others.

Geography
Maytown is located in western Lancaster County, in the western part of East Donegal Township. Pennsylvania Route 743 (Maytown Road / South River Street) passes through the center of town, leading north  to Elizabethtown and south  to Marietta. Pennsylvania Route 441 forms part of the southern edge of the Maytown CDP; it leads northwest  to Middletown and southeast  to Columbia.

The community drains east and west to unnamed direct tributaries of the Susquehanna River.

Demographics

At the 2000 census there were 2,604 people, 917 households, and 751 families living in the CDP. The population density was 709.4 people per square mile (274.0/km). There were 962 housing units at an average density of 262.1/sq mi (101.2/km).  The racial makeup of the CDP was 97.58% White, 0.69% African American, 0.08% Native American, 0.69% Asian, 0.27% from other races, and 0.69% from two or more races. Hispanic or Latino of any race were 1.96%.

There were 917 households, 45.1% had children under the age of 18 living with them, 70.3% were married couples living together, 8.2% had a female householder with no husband present, and 18.1% were non-families. 13.7% of households were made up of individuals, and 3.5% were one person aged 65 or older. The average household size was 2.83 and the average family size was 3.13.

The age distribution was 29.3% under the age of 18, 8.1% from 18 to 24, 37.7% from 25 to 44, 19.2% from 45 to 64, and 5.6% 65 or older. The median age was 31 years. For every 100 females, there were 99.4 males. For every 100 females age 18 and over, there were 96.0 males.

The median household income was $50,122 and the median family income  was $55,216. Males had a median income of $36,761 versus $25,510 for females. The per capita income for the CDP was $18,181. None of the families and 1.0% of the population were living below the poverty line, including no under eighteens and 2.8% of those over 64.

Maytown is part of the Donegal School District, which currently houses four schools. Grades K-2 attend Donegal Primary School. Grades 3-6 attend Donegal Intermediate School. Donegal Junior High School holds grades 7 and 8 while Donegal High School holds grades 9-12. Prior to renovations, Donegal School District had several other schools including the historic Maytown Elementary School. Maytown Elementary School was the oldest operational elementary school in Pennsylvania before being closed in 2012.

Gallery

References 

Census-designated places in Lancaster County, Pennsylvania
Census-designated places in Pennsylvania